Corporal Stanisław Władysław Miedza-Tomaszewski (March 13, 1913 – December 15, 2000), underground nom de guerre Miedza (footpath between fields in Polish), was a Polish war artist, and underground fighter.

Member of the Polish resistance during occupation of Poland in World War II. In cooperation with Józef Walaszczyk, he was helping Jews living in the Warsaw ghetto, bringing them food, medicines and documents. He escaped from the transport to Pawiak prison after arrest, and left besieged Warsaw with the civilian population. Miedza-Tomaszewski is the author of the 1977 memoir Benefis konspiratora about his Warsaw Uprising experiences. Those events served as the basis for the movie Umarłem, aby żyć ( so as to live, 1984).

Miedza-Tomaszewski graduated from the Academy of Fine Arts in Warsaw when the war broke out. In the Polish resistance, he was one of the members of the Bureau of Information and Propaganda. He designed posters and underground stamps. He was a brother of photographer Jerzy Tomaszewski (also a member of Polish Armia Krajowa) who photographed the Warsaw Uprising before being seriously wounded; and Andrzej Tomaszewski nom de guerre 'Andrzej', also an underground fighter. He was the oldest of six brothers.

Stanisław Miedza-Tomaszewski was the godfather of Polish president Lech Kaczyński.

Honours 

 Silver Cross of Merit
 Cross of Valour

References

Bibliography 

 Lubomir Mackiewicz, Anna Żołna (ed.), Kto jest kim w Polsce. Informator biograficzny, Volume 3, Warsaw 1993, s. 745 (see: Tomaszewski-Miedza)
  
 

1913 births
2000 deaths
Academy of Fine Arts in Warsaw alumni
Academic staff of the Academy of Fine Arts in Warsaw
Home Army members
Lech Kaczyński
Recipients of the Silver Cross of Merit (Poland)
Recipients of the Cross of Valour (Poland)
Polish printmakers
Burials at Powązki Cemetery
Polish draughtsmen